Aroma Township is one of seventeen townships in Kankakee County, Illinois, USA.  As of the 2010 census, its population was 5,157 and it contained 2,203 housing units.

Geography

Aroma township includes the Iroquois Woods Nature Preserve and Strasma Park.

Cities, towns, villages
 Aroma Park (vast majority)
 Kankakee (east edge)
 Sammons Point (east edge)
 Sun River Terrace (southwest quarter)

Adjacent townships
 Ganeer Township (northeast)
 St. Anne Township (southeast)
 Papineau Township, Iroquois County (south)
 Chebanse Township, Iroquois County (southwest)
 Kankakee Township (west)
 Otto Township (west)
 Bourbonnais Township (northwest)

Cemeteries
The township contains these six cemeteries: Aroma Park, B'nai Israel, Bebe Family, Kankakee Memorial Gardens, Flower, and Leggtown.

Major highways
  Illinois Route 1
  Illinois Route 17

Demographics

Government
The township is governed by an elected Town Board of a Supervisor and four Trustees.  The Township also has an elected Assessor, Clerk, Highway Commissioner and Supervisor.  The Township Office is located at 3955 South 3250 East Road, St. Anne, IL 60964.

Political districts
 Illinois's 11th congressional district
 State House District 79
 State Senate District 40

School districts
 Kankakee School District 111
 Momence Community Unit School District 1

References
 
 United States Census Bureau 2007 TIGER/Line Shapefiles
 United States National Atlas

External links
 Kankakee County Official Site
 City-Data.com
 Illinois State Archives

Townships in Kankakee County, Illinois
Populated places established in 1853
Townships in Illinois